Hannu Tihinen (born 1 July 1976) is a Finnish former professional footballer who played as a centre-back. He has worked since January 2014 as a sports director at the Football Association of Finland.

He has played for clubs in Finland, Norway, England, Belgium and Switzerland. Tihinen achieved five championships in three countries in a career that ended in 2010, a cup title in two countries and captained almost all of his club teams.

Club career
Born in Keminmaa, Lapland, Tihinen started his career with KePS in the lower divisions before moving to Veikkausliiga club HJK for the 1997 season. He won both the Finnish championship and Finnish Cup once with HJK, and also earned UEFA Champions League experience with the club in the 1998–99 season.

Tihinen then joined Norwegian club Viking in November 1999. He scored a decisive own goal in the final of the Norwegian Cup in 2000, but won the Cup championship the following year and headed the goal into the right goal. Tihinen spent two and a half seasons with Viking, while also having a brief loan spell at West Ham United in the English Premiership. Whilst at West Ham he played in their 1–0 victory over Manchester United at Old Trafford in the 2000–01 FA Cup.

In 2002 Tihinen joined Belgian club Anderlecht. He played in Belgium for four years, winning two Belgian championships. Tihinen scored the 1-0 winning goal against Lyon in the Champions League match in November 2003.

After Tihinen's contract with Anderlecht expired in the summer of 2006, he was snapped up by FC Zürich on a three-year deal. He was captain of the 2006–07 Swiss Championship and the 2008–09 Swiss Championship winning team. On 30 September 2009, Tihinen scored the winning goal for Zürich after ten minutes against A.C. Milan in the Group C game of the 2009–10 UEFA Champions League.

On 7 May 2010, Tihinen announced that he would retire after the 2009–10 season, mainly because of his head injuries. His last game was an away draw (3–3) against Neuchâtel Xamax on 16 May 2010.

International career
Tihinen made his debut for the Finnish national team on 5 June 1999 against Turkey. He scored five goals in the national team matches and formed Finland's regular central defensive pairing with Sami Hyypiä for most of the 2000s. Tihinen captained the national team in a match known as the eagle-owl match against Belgium in June 2007. In the match, an eagle-owl flew onto the field and the game was stopped for a while. The nickname Eagle-owls of the Finnish national team originated from this event.

Helmet
Tihinen injured his head many times during his career. Because of that he wore a helmet during his last seasons. He was also very good with his head, which he used to score most of his goals.

Post-playing career
After retiring, Tihinen joined FC Zürich as a deputy sports director.

On 13 April 2012, he announced his candidacy to run for the new president of the Football Association of Finland, as the post was left open after Sauli Niinistö was elected as President of Finland. In the years 2012-2014, Tihinen was the chairman of the Finnish Football Players´ Association. 

After his career, Tihinen has studied international leadership and management at the UEFA Academy and at the Aalto University in Helsinki and since 2014, he has been the technical director of the Football Association of Finland.

Career statistics
Scores and results list Finland’s goal tally first, score column indicates score after each Tihinen goal.

Honours
HJK
Veikkausliiga: 1997
Finnish Cup: 1998
Finnish League Cup: 1997, 1998
The best defender of the Finnish Veikkausliiga 1999

Viking
Norwegian Cup: 2001

Anderlecht
Belgian First Division: 2003–04, 2005–06

Zürich
Swiss Super League: 2007, 2009
The best defender in the Swiss Axpo Super League 2009

References

External links
  Profile at FA of Finland's official website
  Profile at FC Zürich's official website

1976 births
Living people
Finnish footballers
Finland international footballers
Association football central defenders
Veikkausliiga players
Eliteserien players
Premier League players
Belgian Pro League players
Swiss Super League players
Helsingin Jalkapalloklubi players
Viking FK players
West Ham United F.C. players
R.S.C. Anderlecht players
FC Zürich players
Finnish expatriate footballers
Finnish expatriate sportspeople in Norway
Expatriate footballers in Norway
Finnish expatriate sportspeople in England
Expatriate footballers in England
Finnish expatriate sportspeople in Belgium
Expatriate footballers in Belgium
Finnish expatriate sportspeople in Switzerland
Expatriate footballers in Switzerland
People from Keminmaa
Sportspeople from Lapland (Finland)